Arsène Roux (February 5, 1893 in Rochegude – July 19, 1971) was a French Arabist and Berberologist. He was born in Rochegude and emigrated to Morocco (then occupied by France) in his early twenties where he started studying Classical Arabic, Moroccan Arabic and the Moroccan Berber languages. In the following years, he worked in various schools and universities as a professor and director; he also founded and presided over the Collège Berbère d'Azrou.

During his time in Morocco he collected and studied an enormous amount of Shilha and Central Atlas Tamazight texts and manuscripts with the help of his Berber assistant Si Ibrahim al-Kunki (b. 1905). Some of these texts were published by himself in Rabat for use in his Shilha Berber courses (e.g. Roux 1942); the majority however was taken to France upon his return there in the middle of the 1950s, where he continued his studies and he set out to correct, index and translate his collection of texts. Somehow, nothing of his extensive scholarly work actually saw publication except for a two-page summary of a lecture (Roux, 1948). He also worked together with the egyptologist Bruno Stricker on an edition and translation of Baḥr ad-dumu (Ocean of Tears), by Muḥammad Awzal, which was published in 1960.

After his death in 1971 his descendants donated his library to the Institut de Recherches méditerranéennes in Aix-en-Provence, where the Fonds Arsène Roux is still administered today. It contains more than two hundred Sous Berber manuscript texts, some Arabic manuscripts and an extensive collection of riddles, proverbs, tales, and religious legends written down by Roux himself. A catalogue of the Arabic and Berber manuscripts has been prepared by van den Boogert (1995), while the other texts have been indexed in Stroomer & Peyron (2003).

Bibliography and references

Arsène Roux and Michael Peyron, Poésies berbères de l’époque héroïque, Maroc central (1908–1932), Aix-en-Provence: Edisud 2002

External links 

  (earliest 1990)

1893 births
1971 deaths
People from Drôme
Linguists from France
Berberologists
French Arabists
20th-century linguists
French emigrants to Morocco